QuantLib is an open-source software library which provides tools for software developers and practitioners interested in financial instrument valuation and related subjects. QuantLib is written in C++.

History
The QuantLib project was started by a few quantitative analysts who worked at RiskMap (currently StatPro Italia). The first e-mail announcing QuantLib to the world was sent on December 11, 2000, and signed by Ferdinando Ametrano, Luigi Ballabio and Marco Marchioro. RiskMap was founded by Dario Cintioli, Ferdinando Ametrano, Luigi Ballabio, Adolfo Benin, and Marco Marchioro. The people at RiskMap faced the problem, not for the first time in their life, to build a financial library from scratch. It was Ferdinando's idea to build an open source library that could be used by quants all over the world when starting to build a new quantitative library. Currently, the QuantLib project is headed by Luigi Ballabio and Ferdinando Ametrano.

Release History

Usage
QuantLib is available as C++ source code which is compiled into a library. It is known to work on Windows, Mac OS X, Linux and other Unix-like operation systems.

It can be linked with other languages via SWIG. The Python binding can be installed via pip; the "RQuantLib" package makes parts of QuantLib accessible from R.

Much of QuantLib's functionality can be used in Excel via the add-in QuantlibXL.

Licensing
QuantLib is released under a modified BSD license known as the XFree86-type license. It is GPL compatible.

Features
The software provides various facilities for computing values of financial instruments and related calculations. It is a major example of Mathematical finance. Its main use is in quantitative analysis.

The financial instruments and derivatives it can evaluate include
Options
 Asian options
 Basket options
 Cliquet options
 Compound options
 Digital options
 Lookback options
 Vanilla options
Bonds
 Amortizing bonds
 Convertible bonds
 Fixed rate bonds
 Floating rate bonds
 Zero-coupon bonds
Yield curve
Date calculations
 Calendars
 Date calculations
 Day counting methods
Swaps
 Asset swaps
 BMA swaps
 Year-on-year inflation swaps
 Vanilla swaps
Quantos
Currencies

It has models for 
Yield curves
Interest rates
Volatility

It can compute derivative prices using methods including:
Analytic formulae
Tree methods
Finite difference methods
Monte Carlo methods

See also
Mathematical finance
List of finance topics#Financial markets

References

External links
 QuantLib homepage
 Is QuantLib over engineered?
 QuantLib in C++ Reference

Free computer libraries
Mathematical finance
Free software programmed in C++